The following is a list of episodes for the Disney Channel series Kim Possible, which aired from June 7, 2002, to September 7, 2007. A total of four seasons, 87 episodes, and three TV movies were produced.

Series overview

Episodes

Season 1 (2002–03) 
Note: All episodes in this season were directed by Chris Bailey.

Season 2 (2003–04)

Season 3 (2004–06)
Note: From episode 52 to the end of the series, all episodes were directed by Steve Loter.

Crossover with Lilo & Stitch: The Series (2005)

Season 4 (2007)

References

See also
 List of Lilo & Stitch: The Series episodes - includes "Rufus"

External links

Lists of American children's animated television series episodes
Lists of Disney Channel television series episodes
Episodes